The Lycée Aline Mayrisch is a high school in Luxembourg City, in southern Luxembourg.  It is located on Campus Geesseknäppchen, along with several other educational institutions, most of which, including the Lycée Aline Mayrisch, is in the quarter of Hollerich, in the south-west of the city.

It is named after Aline Mayrisch: a famous women's rights campaigner, socialite, and philanthropist, President of the Luxembourgian Red Cross, and wife of industrialist Émile Mayrisch.

Footnotes

External links
 School official website

Aline Mayrisch
Educational institutions established in 2001
Educational institutions in Luxembourg
2001 establishments in Luxembourg